Gadowar Singh Sahota (Punjabi: ਗਦੋਵਰ ਸਿੰਘ ਸਹੋਤਾ); born December 8, 1954) is an Indo-Canadian semi-retired professional wrestler known as Gama Singh (Punjabi: ਗਾਮਾ ਸਿੰਘ) and Great Gama  Sahota was a villainous mainstay and top attraction in Stu Hart's Stampede Wrestling in Calgary for much of the 1970s and 1980s. Sahota also wrestled internationally in Japan, South Africa, Germany, Kuwait, Dubai, Oman, Australia, the United States and the Caribbean. He also worked sporadically, mostly on overseas tours, for Vince McMahon and the World Wrestling Federation (WWF) from 1980-86. His nephew is former WWE Champion Jinder Mahal.  Singh made a brief comeback of sorts in 2018, when he signed with Impact Wrestling as the manager for a stable of Indian wrestlers known as the Desi Hit Squad, but quietly left in 2020.

Early life
His father emigrated to Canada from Punjab, India, with his family joining him in 1963. Sahota went to school in Merritt, British Columbia and excelled in amateur wrestling.

Professional wrestling career

Early career (1973–1974)
In the early 1970s Sahota met Bill Persack, an old time wrestler at a Vancouver YMCA; Persack had watched him wrestle in the amateur ranks and agreed to train him. Training Singh for six months, Persack suggested he go to Calgary, Alberta and Stu Hart's Stampede Wrestling to further his career. Upon moving to Calgary and meeting with Stu Hart, Sahota  began training with Carlos Colon, debuting in Stampede Wrestling in 1973. He would first compete under his own name, but by 1974 would take on the name "Great Gama", in reference to the great Indian star at the turn of the 20th century.

Stampede Wrestling (1974–1990)
Beginning his wrestling career in 1973, Gama Singh was one of the most hated wrestlers of all time in the Stampede Wrestling territory. Singh would first find success in the tag team ranks, winning Stampede's Tag Titles on two occasions, before going on to feud with the Dynamite Kid, taking the Mid-Heavyweight title from him in a ladder match. His most famous championship run, however, would be with Stampede Wrestling's British Commonwealth Mid-Heavyweight Championship, which he would win six times in the 1980s; with title victories over future renowned stars such as Davey Boy Smith, Owen Hart and Chris Benoit.

Also in the 1980s Gama was a founding member and leader of the hated Karachi Vice stable, which also included Makhan Singh, Steve DiSalvo, Vokhan Singh, Kerry Brown, Rhonda Singh, Ron Starr and managers JR Foley and Abu Wizal. A much reviled play on the popular 80s TV series Miami Vice and the city of Karachi in Pakistan; the Karachi Vice would dominate Stampede Wrestling in the late 1980s, becoming a cult sensation within Calgary. In an era when wrestling was treated as a real sport rather than spectacle, Gama Singh incensed much hatred as a wrestling villain in Calgary, receiving racist threats and often encountered people swearing at him on the street. Stampede wrestling would be purchased by Vince McMahon's World Wrestling Federation (WWF)  in 1984, but return under Bruce Hart running with Gama as one of the top attractions until 1990.

NWA: All-Star Wrestling (1977–1979)
Aside from Stampede Wrestling, and his later WWF tours, Gama Singh spent much of the late 1970s in Vancouver's All-Star Wrestling. He mostly competed in Tag Team bouts with partners such as Guy Mitchell and Buck Zumhofe; culminating in a Tag Title win with partner Igor Volkoff.

International career (1978–1994)
Apart from competing in the odd NWA affiliated promotion in the United States; Singh also took part in several tours of NJPW in Japan in the late 1970s, often teaming with Tiger Jeet Singh, and taking on greats such as Tatsumi Fujinami, Seiji Sakaguchi and Riki Choshu. At various times in his career, Gama worked for WWC and various other promotions in the Caribbean as well; once winning the WWC Caribbean Heavyweight Championship from Ciclon Negro in Puerto Rico in 1980. He would also prove very popular in South Africa, engaging in tours which included bouts against his friend Bad News Allen; and also competed for WPW in Germany in the mid-1990s, teaming with longtime associate 'Champagne' Gerry Morrow.

World Wrestling Federation/WWF (1980–1986) 
In the early eighties, Vince McMahon, Jr. widely expanded the WWE and was looking for an Indian wrestler to work on various tours in the Middle East. Gama Singh began working for Jack Tunney in Toronto and then worked several overseas tours for the WWF in Kuwait, United Arab Emirates, Oman, Australia and Hawaii. While in the United States in 1984/1985, Singh would mostly compete in undercard matches on WWF house-shows. He would, however, appear on WWF television defeating Johnny Rodz on Prime Time Wrestling, and also appeared on the June 27, 1985 edition of WWF's Tuesday Night Titans; interviewed by McMahon and accompanied by an Indian Rock Python.

Impact Wrestling (2018–2020)
Singh signed a deal with Impact Wrestling in January 2018 as a manager of the Desi Hit Squad with Rohit Raju, Gursinder Singh, Mahabali Shera and his son Raj Singh, but when COVID-19 pandemic travel restrictions began in 2020, he remained in Canada, and did not return to Impact once it resumed tapings in Nashville, quietly leaving the company.

Personal life
Gama started investing money in real estate eventually becoming a renowned real estate developer in Calgary. His brother Akam would also become a professional wrestler, as would his son, Raj Singh. His nephew Yuvraj Singh Dhesi, would go on to the WWE, as Jinder Mahal and win the WWE Championship in 2017.

Championships and accomplishments
Central States Wrestling
NWA Central States Tag Team Championship (1 time) – with Bob Brown
NWA All-Star Wrestling
NWA Canadian Tag Team Championship (Vancouver version) (1 time) - with Igor Volkoff
Stampede Wrestling
Stampede Wrestling British Commonwealth Mid-Heavyweight Championship (6 times)
Stampede Wrestling International Tag Team Championship (3 times) - with Ed Morrow (2) and Crary Stevenson (1)
Stampede Wrestling World Mid-Heavyweight Championship (3 times)
World Wrestling Council
WWC Caribbean Heavyweight Championship (1 time)
WWC Trinidad and Tobago Tag Team Championship (1 time) - with Victor Jovica

References

External links
Slam Wrestling Canadian Hall of Fame
 

1954 births
20th-century professional wrestlers
Canadian male professional wrestlers
Living people
Stampede Wrestling alumni
Indian emigrants to Canada
Indian male professional wrestlers
Canadian male actors of Indian descent
Stampede Wrestling British Commonwealth Mid-Heavyweight Champions
Stampede Wrestling International Tag Team Champions
Stampede Wrestling World Mid-Heavyweight Champions